The 2016 Kehoe Cup is an inter-county and colleges hurling competition in the province of Leinster. The competition is ranked below the Walsh Cup and features second and third tier counties from Leinster. Kildare were the winners.

Teams
County teams:
Fingal
Kildare
Longford
Louth
Wicklow
Third level:
Maynooth University
St Patrick's–Mater Dei (a combination of Mater Dei Institute of Education and St Patrick's College, Drumcondra)
Trinity College Dublin

Results

Group 1

Longford 1-14 5-17 St Pats/Mater Dei, Newtownforbes
Kildare 5-24 0-4 Trinity College, Hawkfield
Longford 2-11 2-21 Trinity College, Glennon Brothers Pearse Park
Kildare 5-16 3-9 St Pats/Mater Dei, Newbridge
Kildare 3-13 Longford 0–7, Glennon Brothers Pearse Park
Trinity College 4-15 St Pats-Mater Dei 0–7, Drumcondra

Group 2

Wicklow 1-10 Maynooth University 3–15, Bray Emmets
Louth 4-10 Fingal 1–17, Darver
Wicklow 3-14 0-6 Louth, Ballinakill
Fingal 0-11 7-14 Maynooth University, Swords
Louth 2-10 3-18 Maynooth University, Darver
Wicklow 3-14 0-12 Fingal

Final

References

Kehoe Cup
Kehoe Cup